Henry Nelson may refer to:

Henry Nelson, 2nd Baron Nelson of Stafford (1917–1995)
Henry Nelson, 7th Earl Nelson (1894–1972), British peer
Henry C. Nelson (1836–?), American lawyer and politician
Henry Addison Nelson (1820-1906), American clergyman

See also
Harry Nelson (disambiguation)